Norman de Mattos Bentwich  (28 February 1883 – 8 April 1971) was a British barrister and legal academic. He was the British-appointed attorney-general of Mandatory Palestine and a lifelong Zionist.

Biography

Early life
Norman Bentwich was the oldest son of British Zionist Herbert Bentwich. He attended St Paul's School in London and Trinity College, Cambridge, where he was said to be the "favorite pupil" of John Westlake. 

Bentwich was a delegate at the annual Zionist Congresses from 1907 to 1912. He paid his first visit to Palestine in 1908.

He was commissioned in the Egyptian Camel Transport Corps on 1 January 1916. He was awarded the Military Cross and, in 1919, received the OBE.

Mandatory Palestine administration

During the British military administration of Palestine, Bentwich served as Senior Judicial Officer, which continued in the civil administration after 1920 as Legal Secretary. The title was soon changed to Attorney-General, a post he held until 1931.

Bentwich played a major role in the development of Palestinian law. According to Likhovski, he "concentrated his efforts on providing Palestine with a set of modern commercial laws that he believed would facilitate economic development and thus attract more Jewish immigration." Bentwich's perceived Zionist bias made him increasingly unpopular with Palestinian Arabs, who conducted demonstrations and other protests against his presence in the administration. Some British officials, including the Colonial Office and the Chief Justice of Palestine Michael McDonnell, saw him as a liability and agitated for his dismissal. In 1929 he was barred from representing the government at the Shaw Commission into the August riots. In late 1930 he went on leave to England, where he unsuccessfully sought to gain support for his continued role in Palestine. He was offered senior judicial positions in Mauritius and Cyprus, but turned them down. In August 1931 his appointment as Attorney-General was terminated by the Under-Secretary of State for the Colonies, who cited "the peculiar racial and political conditions of Palestine, and the difficulties with which the Administration has in consequence to bear."

In November 1929, Bentwich was shot in the thigh by a 17-year-old Arab employee of the Palestine Police. His assailant was sentenced to 15 years hard labour, despite Bentwich personally advocating for him.

Hebrew University
From 1932 to 1951 Bentwich occupied the Chair of International Relations at the Hebrew University of Jerusalem. His first lecture, on "Jerusalem, City of Peace", was disrupted by Jewish students who considered him too conciliatory towards the Arabs. Several of the ringleaders, one of them Avraham Stern, were suspended. Bentwich was a disciple of Zionist thinker Ahad Ha'am, and wrote a book, Ahad Ha'am and His Philosophy, in 1927. He was one of the Jewish members of Palestine Administration who in 1929 joined Brit Shalom, a society founded to find rapprochement between Jews and Arabs in Palestine.

Later
He was later President of the Jewish Historical Society of England.

In his book, Mandate Memories, he stated that "the Balfour Declaration was not an impetuous or sentimental act of the British government, as has been sometimes represented, or a calculated measure of political warfare. It was a deliberate decision of British policy and idealist politics, weighed and reweighed, and adopted only after full consultation with the United States and with other Allied Nations."

During the Second World War, Bentwich was commissioned into the Royal Air Force and on 24 February 1942 was promoted to Flight Lieutenant. On 16 December 1942, as Pilot Officer N. De M. Bentwich OBE MC (RAF/115215), he was cashiered by sentence of a General Court Martial, but this was not reported in the  London Gazette until 23 February 1943. The unusual circumstances of this are explained in Bentwich’s book Wanderer in War, 1939-45 (1946). By misfortune, he had dropped an important secret document in the street, and his superiors decided to make an example of him as a warning to others. However, he was then able to join the Ministry of Information, working for Sir Wyndham Deedes,  Regional Officer for Greater London. This work took him to the large East End bomb shelters, where steps were taken to transform them into community centres. He also travelled to Ethiopia, on a legal assignment for the Emperor.

Bentwich lived the last twenty years of his life in London, where his wife, Helen Bentwich, had a political career as a member of London County Council.
Among his other roles, he served as President of the North Western Reform Synagogue in Alyth Gardens, Temple Fortune, from 1958 until his death.

Academic and legal career
 Called to the bar (Lincoln's Inn), 1908
 Ministry of Justice, Cairo, 1912–1915
 Major, Camel Transport, 1916–1918
 Legal secretary to military administration, Palestine, 1918–22
 First attorney-general in mandatory government of Palestine, 1922–30
 Recalled to Colonial Office, 1930–31
 Professor of International Relations, Hebrew University of Jerusalem, 1932 and 1945–1951
 Director of League of Nations High Commission for Refugees from Germany, 1933–1935
 British Ministry of Information and Air Ministry, 1939–45
 Co-editor of the Jewish Review, 1910–1913 and 1932–1934
 Lecturer at Hague Academy of International Law, 1929, 1934 and 1955
 Vice-President, Jewish Committee for Relief Abroad
 Chairman, National Peace Council, 1944–1946
 Chairman, United Restitution Organization, 1948–1971
 Foreign Office Committee on Restitution in British Zone of Germany, 1951
 President, Jewish Historical Society, 1960–1962
 Chairman, Friends of Hebrew University
 President of North Western Reform Synagogue, Alyth Gardens, London 1958–71

Published works 

Bentwich published a large number of books and articles. Some of his books are listed here.

 Philo-Judaeus of Alexandria, Jewish Publication Society of America, Philadelphia, 1910.
 The Declaration of London, with an introduction and notes and appendices, E. Wilson, London, 1911.
 Students leading cases and statutes on international law, Sweet & Maxwell, London, 1913.
 Josephus, Jewish Publication Society of America, Philadelphia, 1914.
 Palestine of the Jews: past, present and future, London, 1919.
 Hellenism, The Jewish publication society of America, Philadelphia, 1919.
 Ahad Ha'am and his philosophy, Keren Hayesod (Palestine Foundation Fund) and the Keren Kayemeth Le-Israel, Jerusalem, 1927.
 The Mandates System, Longmans, London, 1930.
 England in Palestine, Kegan Paul, Trench, Trubner & Co. Ltd., London, 1932.
A Wanderer in the Promised Land, The Soncino Press, 1932
 Palestine, Benn, London, 1934.
 Fulfilment in the Promised land, 1917–1937, Soncino Press, London, 1938.
 Solomon Schechter: A Biography, Jewish Publication Society of America, Philadelphia, 1938
 Wanderer Between Two Worlds – An Autobiography, Kegan Paul Trench Trubner, London, 1941.
 Judaea lives again, V. Gollancz, London, 1943.
A Wanderer in War, V. Gollancz, London, 1946
 Israel, Ernest Bend, 1952.
 For Zion's Sake. A Biography of Judah L. Magnes. First Chancellor and First President of the Hebrew University of Jerusalem, Jewish Publication Society, 1954.
 Israel And Her Neighbours: A Short Historical Geography, Rider And Company, London, 1955. 
 The Jews in our Times, Penguin Books, Harmondsworth, 1960.
 Israel Resurgent, Ernest Benn, London, 1960.
 My 77 years : an account of my life and times, 1883–1960, Jewish Publication Society of America, Philadelphia, 1961.
 Mandate Memories (with Helen Bentwich), The Hogarth Press, London, 1965.
 Israel : two fateful years, 1967–69, Elec, London, 1970.
 Jewish Youth Comes Home: The Story of the Youth Aliyah, 1933-1943, Hyperion Press, 1976.

References

External links
 
 
  – his Yorke prize essay from 1906.

1883 births
1971 deaths
20th-century English historians
Academics from London
Alumni of Trinity College, Cambridge
Attorneys-General of Mandatory Palestine
British Army General List officers
British Army personnel of World War I
English Jews
Jewish historians
Lawyers from London
Members of Lincoln's Inn
Officers of the Order of the British Empire
People educated at St Paul's School, London
People from Hampstead
Recipients of the Military Cross
Zionists
20th-century English lawyers